National Route 149 is a national highway of Japan connecting Shimizu-ku, Shizuoka and Shimizu-ku, Shizuoka in Japan, with a total length of 2.6 km (1.62 mi).

References

149
Roads in Shizuoka Prefecture